Gachalá is a municipality and town of Colombia in the Guavio Province, part of the department of Cundinamarca. The municipality borders the western portion of the split municipality Ubalá and the department of Boyacá in the north, the eastern part of Ubalá and Medina in the east, Fómeque, Junín and Gama in the west and Fómeque, Medina and the department of Meta in the south.

Etymology 
The name of Gachalá is derived from Chibcha and means "clay vessel of the night" or "defeat of the night".

History 
Before the Spanish conquest of the Muisca, Gachalá was inhabited by the Chío tribe, belonging to the Muisca. As of 1548, the terrain of Gachalá belonged to the cacique of Guatavita.

Modern Gachalá was founded on February 22, 1810, by Mariano de Mendoza y Bueno.

Economy 
Main economical activity in Gachalá is the hydroelectric plant of the Guavio Reservoir. Also emerald mining is an important source of income for Gachalá. The  Gachalá Emerald was found in and named after Gachalá.

Born in Gachalá 
 Gonzalo Correal Urrego, anthropologist and archaeologist

Gallery

References 

Municipalities of Cundinamarca Department
Populated places established in 1810
1810 establishments in the Spanish Empire
Muisca Confederation
Muysccubun